To Have & to Hold is an American drama television series created by Joanne T. Waters, that aired on CBS from September 30 to December 9, 1998.

The drama series starred Moira Kelly as Annie Cornell, an attorney, and Jason Beghe as her husband, an Irish-American police officer, Sean McGrail.  The series depicted the trials and tribulations of their early married life.

The series had an extensive supporting cast, mostly playing various relatives of Sean's. Appearing in the series were Fionnula Flanagan, Mariette Hartley, Alexa Vega and Rutanya Alda.

The series ran for thirteen episodes, but only airing nine before being cancelled.

Cast
Moira Kelly as Annie Cornell
Jason Beghe as Sean McGrail
Stephen Lee as	Patrick	McGrail
Jason Wiles as Michael McGrail
Stephen Largay	as Tommy McGrail
Fionnula Flanagan as Fiona McGrail	
John Cullum as Robert McGrail
Colleen Flynn as Carolyn McGrail

Episodes

References

External links
 

CBS original programming
1990s American drama television series
1998 American television series debuts
1998 American television series endings
Television series by CBS Studios
Television series by 20th Century Fox Television
Television shows set in Boston
English-language television shows